Ghalidzga ( - Gheli bank)  - river in Ochamchire Municipality (Abkhazia). Length - 53 km, basin area - 483 km2. In the upper reaches there is a mountain river with well-defined rapid currents, in the lower reaches it flows into the lowlands and  Black Sea joins south of Ochamchire. It feeds on rain and groundwater. Knows floods Spring, waterlogging - Winter. Characterized by frequent flooding. Average annual flow near the city of Ochamchire - 25.1 mW / s. The main tributaries are the river Gejiri.

Arrives in the cities of Tkvarcheli and Ochamchire. It is mentioned in 18th century sources as the western border of Samurzakano.

References 

Rivers of Abkhazia
Rivers of Georgia (country)
Tributaries of the Black Sea